The Florida State Seminoles are the athletic teams representing Florida State University located in Tallahassee, Florida. They compete as a member of the National Collegiate Athletic Association (NCAA) Division I level (Football Bowl Subdivision sub-level for football), primarily competing in the Atlantic Coast Conference (ACC) for all sports since the 1991–92 season; within the Atlantic Division in any sports split into a divisional format since the 2005–06 season.

The Seminoles' athletic department fields 20 teams. They have collectively won 21 team national championships, and over 100 team conference championships, as well as numerous individual national and conference titles.

Overview
Florida State Athletics began in 1902 when the then Florida State College football teams played three seasons. The 1905 Buckman Act reorganized the existing seven Florida colleges into three institutions, segregated by race and gender. As a result of this reorganization, the coeducational Florida State College was renamed the Florida State College for Women. The Florida State University again became a co-ed institution in 1947 with most of the newly enrolled male students back from service in World War II. Athletic programs resumed and Florida State fielded its first football team in 43 years with FSU facing Stetson on October 18, 1947.

Florida State was a founding member of the Dixie Conference, in 1948, when other southern institutions seeking to create a "purely amateur" athletic conference based on the principle of complete amateurism, with no athletic scholarships. Three years later, FSU left the conference to become an independent, having won ten conference titles including three in football and two in men's track and field.

In 1976, Florida State joined the Metro Conference in all sports except football, which remained independent. For fifteen years FSU competed and won sixty-eight conference titles as well as five national titles including two in softball, two in women's track and field, and one in women's golf.

Since 1991, Florida State has been a member of the Atlantic Coast Conference. Since joining the conference, FSU has won ninety-six ACC titles and nine national titles including three in football, three in men's track and field, two in soccer, and one in softball. After the 2005 conference expansion was complete, FSU was placed in the newly formed Atlantic Division.

Florida State's school colors of garnet and gold are a merging of the university's past. In 1904 and 1905, the Florida State College won football championships wearing purple and gold uniforms. When FSC became Florida State College for Women in 1905, the FSCW student body selected crimson as the official school color. The administration in 1905 took crimson and combined it with the recognizable purple of the championship football teams to achieve the color garnet. The garnet and gold colors were first used on an FSU uniform in a 14–6 loss to Stetson on October 18, 1947.

On April 11, 2014, as part of the university's 'Ignition Tradition' rebranding of the program, white and black were added to the official school colors. The addition of the two colors is to better represent the colors present on the flag of the Seminole Tribe of Florida.

Mascot

History 
The "Seminoles" name, chosen by students in a 1947 vote, alludes to Florida's Seminole people who in the early nineteenth century resisted efforts of the United States government to remove them from Florida. Since 1978 the teams have been represented by the symbols Osceola and Renegade. The symbol represents an actual historical figure, Seminole war leader Osceola, whose clothing represents appropriate period dress. The athletic logo, in use since the early 1970s, shows a profile of a shouting Seminole warrior in circle. The model for the logo was Florida State music faculty member Thomas Wright, composer of the Florida State University Fight Song and Victory Song.

The university maintains that they do not officially have a mascot, but use the Seminole name in "admiration" of the unconquered tribe. However, the figures of Osceola and Renegade, as well as the athletic logo, are used in a way that is indistinguishable from other mascots; they are used to rally the crowd at sporting events, and emblazoned on T-shirts and other merchandise.

Controversy 
The use of names and images associated with Seminole history is officially sanctioned by the Seminole Tribe of Florida. In 2005, the Tribal Council produced a written resolution affirming their support for the use of their symbolism, and FSU states that they take pride in their "continued collaboration with the tribe".

In 2005, the National Collegiate Athletic Association adopted a policy intended to prevent their schools and athletic programs from using mascots and imagery that are "hostile or abusive" to racial and ethnic minorities. This included Native American mascots, and FSU was specifically flagged as a university with potentially offensive imagery. However, Florida State challenged the policy and was granted a waiver based on their "unique relationship" with the Seminole Tribe.

Though the Florida Seminole Tribal Council made this agreement, they only represent Florida's portion of the Seminole people. In 2013, the Seminole Nation of Oklahoma, which has about four times as many registered members as Florida's Seminole tribe, passed a resolution condemning the use of such imagery on sports teams, making no exception for the kind of agreement FSU made with the Seminole Tribe of Florida. Their statement reads, "the use of American Indian mascots, images, and religious symbols is harmful to all children, and is discriminatory to Native cultures, Native imagery, and violates religious icons". The American Psychological Association has made similar statements about the negative effects of Indigenous mascots, arguing that they promote stereotypes, establish a hostile environment, and undermine the Nations' ability to accurately represent their culture. Students and other members of the Florida State community have also argued against the use of Native imagery, posting about it on school blogs and starting a Change.org petition in August 2021 to "ban racist traditions at FSU".

Rivalries
Florida State maintains two traditional rivals in all sports with the Florida Gators and the Miami Hurricanes. Florida State University is the only school in the State of Florida to play both Florida and Miami year in and year out in all sports. Most notably is the football rivalry with the Gators who hold a 37–27–2 all-time lead against the Seminoles. The series began with Florida dominating for the first few years, but it has since become more balanced. The football rivalry with Miami dates back to 1951, when the Hurricanes defeated the Seminoles 35–13 in their inaugural meeting. The schools have played uninterrupted since 1966, with Miami holding the all-time advantage, 35–32. Florida State holds a 12–7 advantage since the Hurricanes became a conference foe in 2004.

Florida State developed a rivalry with Clemson after being placed in the same division of the conference after the 2004 season. Florida State leads the all-time series 20–15. In addition to their in-state rivals, Florida State enjoys baseball rivalries as well, primarily with Georgia Tech.

Florida State University was founded with money donated by Francis Eppes VII, a grandson of Thomas Jefferson, the third President of the United States (1801–1809), principal author of the Declaration of Independence (1776), and founder of the University of Virginia. As a result, both teams play for the Jefferson-Eppes Trophy in football. With the recent realignment of the divisions, the Seminoles found themselves in one division and the Cavaliers in another.

Athletic directors
Florida State has had 17 athletic directors in its history.

 Howard Danford, 1947–1956
 Tom Nugent, 1957–1958
 Perry Moss, 1959
 Vaughn Mancha, 1959–1971
 Clay Stapleton, 1971–1973
 John Bridgers, 1973–1979

 Phil Fordyce, 1979–1981
 Cecil Ingram, 1981–1989
 Bob Goin, 1990–1994
  Wayne Hogan, 1994 
 Dave Hart Jr., 1995–2007
 William L. Proctor, 2007–2008

 Randy Spetman, 2008–2013
 Vanessa Fuchs, 2013 
 Stan Wilcox, 2013–2018
 David Coburn, 2018–2022
 Michael Alford, 2022–present

Teams 

Florida State University sponsors teams in nine men's and eleven women's NCAA sanctioned sports. Florida State competes as a member of the Coastal Collegiate Sports Association in beach volleyball.

Baseball 

Florida State's baseball program is one of the most successful in collegiate sports, having been to twenty-three College World Series in fifty-nine Tournament appearances, and having appeared in the national championship final on three occasions, (falling to the USC Trojans in 1970, the Arizona Wildcats in 1986, and the Miami Hurricanes in 1999).

Under the command of Head Coach No. 11 Mike Martin (FSU 1966) for forty years, Florida State is the second-winningest program in the history of college baseball. Since 1990, FSU has had more 50 win seasons, been to more NCAA Tournaments and finished in the top 10 more than any other team in the country. Since 2000, FSU is the winningest program in college baseball with more victories and a higher winning percentage in the regular season than any other school. Despite their success, Florida State is still chasing their first CWS Championship, and has the most appearances in the CWS of any program yet to win a national championship.

Basketball

Men's basketball 

Florida State's basketball program has enjoyed modest success since their first appearance in the NCAA tournament in 1968. Since then, the Seminoles have made eighteen tournament appearances, played for the national title in the NCAA championship game in 1972, advanced to the Sweet Sixteen round in 1992, 2011, 2019 and 2021, the Elite Eight round in 1993 and 2018, and won the ACC title in 2012.

A total of 44 Seminoles have been selected in the NBA Draft with nine first round picks. Among those first round selections are Dave Cowens, and George McCloud, the first lottery selection in school history.

Women's basketball 

The women's basketball program has made twenty-one tournament appearances. In the 2006–07 season, Florida State advanced to its first NCAA tournament Sweet Sixteen in school history. The Seminoles won the ACC regular season titles in 2009 and 2010. In 2010, the Seminoles made it to the Elite Eight round, the deepest advance in the tournament in program history, matching that run in 2015 and again in 2017.

Football 

In 1902, the Florida State College in Tallahassee fielded its first varsity football team. The FSC program posted a record of 7–6–1 over the next three seasons, including a record of 3–1 against their rivals from the old University of Florida (formerly known as Florida Agricultural College) in Lake City. In 1904, the Florida State College football team became the first-ever state champions of Florida after beating both the University of Florida and Stetson University. In 1905, however, the Florida Legislature reorganized the state's higher education system by abolishing the existing state-supported colleges, and creating the new University of the State of Florida in Gainesville, and the new Florida State College for Women in Tallahassee. Many former Florida State College male students transferred to the new University of the State of Florida (renamed the University of Florida in 1909).

Following World War II, Florida State College for Women became coeducational and was renamed Florida State University in 1947, and the school once again started a football team. After its first season, FSU joined the Dixie Conference, which it won in each of the three years it was a member. It withdrew from the conference in 1951 and competed as an independent team for the next forty years.

Under head coach Bobby Bowden, the football team became one of the nation's most competitive football teams, greatly expanding the tradition of football at Florida State. The Seminoles played in five national championship games between 1993 and 2001, and have claimed the championship three times, in 1993, 1999, and 2013. The FSU football team was the most successful team in college football during the 1990s, boasting an 89% winning percentage. FSU also set an NCAA record for most consecutive Top 5 finishes in the AP football poll – receiving placement fourteen years in a row, from 1987 to 2000. The Seminoles were the first college football team in history to go wire-to-wire (ranked first place from preseason to postseason) since the AP began releasing preseason rankings in 1936. FSU also owns the record for most consecutive bowl game victories with 11 between 1985 and 1996 and made a post-season appearance for thirty-six straight seasons from 1982 to 2017. The Seminole football team has also won eighteen conference championships in the Dixie and Atlantic Coast.

Florida State's football program has produced many players who went on to NFL careers, including Fred Biletnikoff, Deion Sanders, Terrell Buckley, Derrick Brooks, Sebastian Janikowski, Walter Jones, Corey Simon, Anquan Boldin, Javon Walker, Warrick Dunn, Peter Boulware, Laveranues Coles, Brad Johnson, Samari Rolle, Christian Ponder, Peter Warrick, Jalen Ramsey, Dalvin Cook, Jameis Winston, Darnell Dockett, Dustin Hopkins, Kelvin Benjamin, Graham Gano, Björn Werner, Rodney Hudson, and many others; other notable players include Burt Reynolds and Lee Corso.

Golf

Men's golf 

The Seminoles have made thirty-seven NCAA tournament appearances including twenty-five national championship appearances and eighteen regionals. Florida State has won thirteen conference championships. The Seminoles have appeared in fourteen straight NCAA tournaments and were the top seed in the 2015 tournament, a year in which they won a school record four straight in-season tournaments. In the 2021 season, John Pak won the Haskins Award, Hogan Award, and Nicklaus Award.

Women's golf 

The Seminoles have made eight AIWA tournament appearances, twenty-seven NCAA tournament appearances including twelve national championship appearances and twenty-four regionals. Florida State has won three conference championships.

Women's soccer 

Since adding soccer as a sport, Florida State has made twenty-three appearances in the NCAA tournament and thirteen appearances in the College Cup. The Seminoles won national championships in 2014, 2018, and 2021.

Softball 

The softball team plays at the Seminole Softball Complex; the field is named for JoAnne Graf, the winningest coach in softball history. An 8–1 victory over Jacksonville on February 22, 2006, made her only the second coach in NCAA history to record 1,100 NCAA fast-pitch wins. In 1999, Florida State received a softball complex, which also houses the soccer stadium.

Florida State's accomplishments include two AIAW national championships, one NCAA national championship, eleven trips to the Women's College World Series, thirty-four NCAA tournaments, thirty-five All-Americans, and eighteen conference titles, as well as thirty-eight forty win seasons.

For over two decades, FSU has been one of the most dominant softball programs in the history of collegiate softball. Only five teams in the history of the NCAA have been to more WCWS than Florida State and no school east of Arizona has been to more NCAA tournaments than the Seminoles. Florida State has made a regional appearance every year since 2000.

In 2015, Lacey Waldrop and Maddie O'Brien became the first players from the school to be drafted into the National Pro Fastpitch league and Jessica Burroughs became the school's first number one overall pick in 2017.

Track and field

The men's track and field team has won consecutive NCAA national championships and ACC championships. In 2006, the team had individual champions in the 200 m (Walter Dix), the triple jump (Rafeeq Curry), and the shot put (Garrett Johnson). In 2007, Dix became the first person to hold the individual title in the 100 m, 200 m, and 4*100 m Relay at the same time.

Non-varsity/club teams

Cheerleading

The Florida State cheerleaders cheer at all football games as well as home basketball and volleyball games. The all-girl squad won the National Cheerleaders Association championship in 1997 and the co-ed squad won the Universal Cheerleaders Association championship in 2023. The dance team that performs at football and basketball games is known as the Golden Girls.

Rugby
The Florida State Rugby Football Club was founded in 1970, and plays Division 1 college rugby in the South Independent Rugby Conference, which is not affiliated with the NCAA. The Seminoles won the conference championship in 2012, defeating the University of Central Florida. With this conference championship, FSU qualified for the national playoffs and finished the spring 2012 regular season ranked 22nd in the country. In the national playoffs, Florida State defeated in-state rivals Florida 34-12 in the Sweet 16, before losing to Tennessee 45-27 in the quarterfinals. FSU is led by head coach Michael Gomez.

All-sports program rankings

NCAA all-sports rankings
Directors' Cup

Florida State Athletics has made great strides in the National Association of Collegiate Directors of Athletics (NACDA) standings in the last twenty years. Since joining the Atlantic Coast Conference, FSU has been ranked among the top fifty NCAA Division I athletic programs in the country. From the 2006–2007 through 2014–2015 academic years, Florida State cracked the top 15 every year, including two top 5 finishes in 2009–2010 and 2011–2012, and four top 10 finishes in 2010–2011, 2014–2015, 2017–2018, and 2018–2019.

NACDA All-Sports Rankings

National championships

Florida State has won nineteen national team championships (including ten sponsored by the National Collegiate Athletic Association (NCAA), three by the Association for Intercollegiate Athletics for Women (AIAW), two by the Bowl Championship Series, and one by the Bowl Coalition), and its individual athletes have numerous individual NCAA national championships.

NCAA team championships
Florida State University has won 10 NCAA team national championships:
Men's (4)
Gymnastics (2): 1951, 1952
Outdoor Track & Field (2): 2006, 2008
Women's (6)
Indoor Track and Field (1): 1985
Outdoor Track and Field (1): 1984
Soccer (3): 2014, 2018, 2021
Softball (1): 2018
Florida State has also been national runners-up 20 times in 11 NCAA sports: baseball (3), men's basketball (1), men's cross country (1), women's cross country (2), women's golf (1), softball (1), women's soccer (3), men's indoor track and field (2), men's outdoor track and field (2), women's outdoor track and field (2), and beach volleyball (3).

Other national team championships

Below are the nine national team titles that were bestowed by other college athletics entities:
Men's (6):
Football (3): 1993, 1999, 2013 (FBS)
Volleyball (3): 1955, 1957, 1958 (USVA)
Women's (3):
Golf (1): 1981 (AIAW)
Softball (slowpitch) (2): 1981, 1982 (AIAW)
Florida State has also been national runner-up two times in one NCAA sport (football) for which the NCAA itself does not bestow a championship.

Non-varsity/club national team championships 
Women's (1):
Cheerleading (1): 1997 (NCA)
Co-Ed (1):
Cheerleading (1): 2023 (UCA)

Conference championships

Total Conference Championships (196)
Atlantic Coast Conference (105)
Metro Conference (68)
Dixie Conference (10)
Southeastern Independent (3)
Florida Intercollegiate Conference (3)
Coastal Collegiate Sports Association (6)

Division championships

Athletic facilities

Florida State University has invested and continues to invest largely in the athletic centers and facilities around campus. The most visible stadium is Bobby Bowden Field at Doak Campbell Stadium which is surrounded by the University Center, which houses the university administration, several colleges and departments.

Coyle E. Moore Athletics Center

The Coyle E.  Moore Athletic Center is located on the north side of the University Center and is the center of Florida State Athletics and its 400-plus student-athletes. It is home to the Athletics Administration and support staff and houses the Executive Staff, Business Office, Computer Information Services, Coaches' Video, Seminole Productions, College of Communication faculty offices and student edit rooms, Academic Support, Student Services, Compliance, Sports Information, Digital Media, Marketing and Promotions, Facilities and Event Management, classrooms, a dining facility with a full service kitchen, and a mailroom. Initially built in the 1950s as a football field house, the original infrastructure of the athletic center plumbing, sewage, and air-conditioning had become inadequate to the demands placed upon it by far more student-athletes and staff than it was designed for. In 2004, the Moore Building underwent an overhaul makeover to match the appearance of the rest of the University Center with a more efficient floor plan to allow for more room for growth. The new facility includes a dining hall, a 15,000 square foot training and rehab facility, and a more than 8,000 square foot tutorial and study hall space. A multi-purpose theater for team meetings, press conferences, and symposiums is also located on the first floor of the Moore Athletic Center. In an effort to enhance the studies of Florida State students, there is also a designated space for athletic-training curriculum and a studio provided for the College of Communication students to gain hands on experience producing work for Seminole athletics.

Albert J. Dunlap Athletic Training Facility

The Dunlap Indoor Practice Facility is the indoor field used by the football team. It is located adjacent to the stadium, next to the outdoor practice fields.

Bill Harkins Field at the Manley R. Whitcomb Band Complex

Bill Harkins Field at the Manley R. Whitcomb Band Complex is an artificial turf with rubber fill field built near the Flying High Circus on Chieftain Way. The field is an exact replica of what Bobby Bowden field looked like on game days at the time of the field's construction. Since then several alterations have been made to the actual field. Bill Harkins, head coach of the men's lacrosse team from 2004 to 2013, donated $350,000 towards the construction of the new field. Previously the space was a grassy field that often alternated between dusty and muddy. The Florida State University Marching Chiefs have primary use of the field and use it for their daily practices. The football team and lacrosse teams have secondary use of the field with the lacrosse team using the field for practices and games. The football team sometimes uses the practice field in anticipation of games at stadiums with artificial turf.

Bobby Bowden Field at Doak Campbell Stadium

The stadium, named after FSU President Doak Campbell, hosted its first game against the Randolph-Macon College Yellowjackets on October 7, 1950, with the Seminoles winning the game 40–7. At that time the facility had a seating capacity of 15,000. Florida State began to play at Centennial Field during the team's 1947 season and would continue to play there for the following two years (1948 and 1949). Florida State College – FSU predecessor institution – also fielded teams from 1902 to 1904 (precise location of where games were played is not documented). Doak Campbell Stadium, with its original capacity of 15,000 in 1950, was built at a cost of $250,000. In 1954, the stadium grew to a capacity of 19,000. Six thousand more seats were added in 1961. During the Bill Peterson era (1960–70), the stadium was expanded to 40,500 seats, and it remained at that capacity for the next 14 years. Since that time, the stadium has expanded to 82,300, largely in part to the success of the football team under head coach Bobby Bowden coupled with the ever growing student body. It now is the second largest football stadium in the ACC. Aesthetically, a brick facade surrounding the stadium matches the architectural design of most of the buildings on the university's campus. In addition to the obvious recreational uses, The University Center surrounds the stadium and houses many of the university's offices. The field was officially named Bobby Bowden field on November 20, 2004, as Florida State hosted intrastate rival Florida.

Donald L. Tucker Civic Center

The Donald L. Tucker Center is the home for Seminole basketball is named in honor of Donald L. Tucker, a former Speaker of the Florida House of Representatives and Special Ambassador for the United States to the Dominican Republic. Prior to the 2000–01 basketball season, the center completed an expansion project which began in October 1998 in which 34 luxury suites and 468 club seats at mid-level in the arena were added. In addition, the upper level seating was configured to offer better viewing and additional concession stands and restrooms were added. The Spotlight Grill, a 450-seat arena-view restaurant includes an outdoor patio and ledge seating for viewing arena events. The multi-purpose facility, which opened its doors in 1981, covers over 22 acres in the heart of Tallahassee's downtown district. The Civic Center is only two blocks from the Capitol building and is just across the street from FSU's nationally-acclaimed Law School and Center for Professional Development. The complex covers over 18,000 square feet with 119-foot ceilings in the main arena. The Tucker Center is actually three different areas combined under one roof. The main arena, where FSU hosts its home games. The Exhibition Hall, which joins the main arena via a hallway, can seat 5,000 for an event or serve as an indoor display area. The complex also features a terrace, which is popular for outdoor hosting.

Seminole Basketball Training Center
The 40,000 square foot Florida State Basketball Training Center is attached to the Donald L. Tucker Center and is one of the nation's top basketball-only facilities. The $10 million facility  opened in April 2002 is home to the Seminole men's and women's basketball programs and is truly a first class facility for its players and coaching staff. It provides a permanent home for the Seminoles to practice, hold meetings and watch film. The Seminoles have their own practice floor, locker rooms, coaches' offices, meeting and film rooms, an expansive player's lounge, a tradition room and offices for support staff.

Don Veller Seminole Golf Course

The Don Veller Seminole Golf course was originally built in 1962, later redesigned in 2004 and is home to the Seminoles' practice greens, training center and the Dave Middleton Golf Center. The golf center houses the SGC clubhouse and is also the location of the team's private facilities. Florida State golfers have a team room, on course workout facility and state of the art training center. The team room / facility is utilized for team meetings, as a study area between classes and practices and as a lounge when the team is not on the course. The course is Par 72 of 6,940 yards with a 73.4 course rating.

JoAnne Graf Field at the Seminole Softball Complex

The Florida State Soccer/Softball Complex was opened with a ribbon-cutting ceremony Saturday, April 17, 1999. The event, which was held in conjunction with Florida State's 30th Anniversary of Women's Intercollegiate Athletics Spring Celebration. JoAnne Graf Field hosted back-to-back NCAA Regionals in 2001 and 2002 and then again in 2004 and 2009. Known as one of NCAA softball's best venues, JoAnne Graf Field is a modernized field of play that caters quite well to student-athletes, coaches, fans and other spectators. Since opening in 1999, Florida State has played to the venue's home-field advantage. The Seminoles have recorded 384 victories in their 15 years at JoAnne Graf Field. Two major changes were made to the complex in the mid 2000s. On April 2, 2005, former university president Dr. T.K. Wetherell and former Athletics Director, Dave Hart, officially renamed the softball stadium "JoAnne Graf Field at the Seminole Softball Complex". She joined Bob Heck at Georgia State as the only two active softball coaches with fields named after them. In the fall of 2006, the stadium got a facelift as a Florida State unveiled a brand new video scoreboard for the 2007 season. The team building underwent a multi-million dollar renovation to the second floor which began in October 2008. The expansion to the second floor now includes new offices, a team meeting room, tradition space for both softball and soccer and a player lounge. In 2011 when a new indoor batting facility was constructed, approaching nearly 12,000 square feet. It is a two-story facility that includes a large bullpen, hitting nets and a wide area on the top floor for stretching and other softball activities. Another recent addition to the field was the installation of new wall padding in 2013.

Lucy McDaniel Volleyball Court at Tully Gymnasium
Tully Gymnasium has been home to Florida State volleyball for many years. The facility, which was constructed in 1956, was named for the late Robert Henry (Bobby) Tully, a 1952 FSU graduate and football player. Active on campus, Tully was a member of Gold Key, Omicron Delta Kappa, the Arnold Air Society and Alpha Tau Omega fraternity. He died in May 1954 after battling illness. With a capacity of 1,162, the gymnasium has undergone several renovations in recent years. Prior to the 2004 season, the playing floor was replaced with a new state-of-the-art Nike Shox floor. New lighting was added before the 1999 season. Most recently in 2011, locker room renovations occurred to add to the facility's appeal. Tully Gymnasium also features new arena-style padded  seating with armrests which were installed to create a more comfortable atmosphere for Seminole fans while watching Florida State volleyball. On November 2, 2000, in a special ceremony, Florida State dedicated the floor of Tully Gymnasium to Lucy McDaniel, the first woman in the state of Florida to donate more than one million dollars to a women's athletic program. The facility became known as the Lucy McDaniel Volleyball Court at Tully Gymnasium prior to the 2001 season, in honor of the gifts and support that McDaniel has provided to the Lady Seminole volleyball program and Florida State athletics.

Florida State University Beach Volleyball Courts
In 2012, Florida State started intercollegiate competition in beach volleyball, which the NCAA then called "sand volleyball". Beach volleyball courts were constructed adjacent to Mike Long Track and the soccer training fields.

Mcintosh Track and Field Building at Mike Long Track

Named after Florida State's first track and field head coach, the complex has attracted some of the top meets in the nation. Mike Long Track and the City of Tallahassee played host to the USA Track and Field National Junior Championships in 1988 and the AAU National Championships in 1991. Florida State and Mike Long Track also hosted the Atlantic Coast Conference Outdoor Track and Field Championships in 1992 and 2005. The USA Track and Field National Junior Championships returned ti Mike Long Track in the Summer of '94. The British Olympic Team, who trained in Tallahassee for the 1996 Atlanta Summer Olympics, used the facility for all their track and field practices and workouts over the summer. The Florida State track and field team has been calling Mike Long Track home now for 53 years. The 2003 season marked the unveiling of Mike Long Track's brand new track, complete with a new surface, wider lanes, faster turns and a larger infield area for hosting field events. Seating capacity was also expanded to accommodate 1,500 spectators. The competition areas were resurfaced before the start of the 2008 season. In the spring of 2008 the newest addition to the facility, an 18,000-foot expansion gave the center a total space of 22,000 square feet. The improvements benefit not only the track and field/cross country programs, but also volleyball, soccer, softball and tennis student-athletes. The expanded center includes locker rooms, student-athlete lounges, medical preparation areas, coaches' offices and a conference room.

Mike Martin Field at Dick Howser Stadium

Located on the campus of Florida State University, Dick Howser Stadium is named after the late Kansas City Royals and Florida State manager who was also Florida State's first-ever baseball All-American. The stadium was dedicated in honor of Dick Howser in March 1988 prior to an exhibition game between Florida State and the Kansas City Royals, two of Howser's former teams. As part of the stadium dedication, Kansas City all-stars George Brett and Bo Jackson helped unveil a bronze bust of Howse in Haggard Baseball Plaza. A two-year, $12 million project was completed in 2004 and stadium capacity increased to 6,700. On April 2, 2005, Florida State University dedicated the field at Dick Howser to current head coach Mike Martin. Florida State's skipper for the last 30 years now coaches on the diamond bearing his name, Mike Martin Field at Dick Howser Stadium.

Morcom Aquatics Center
In 2008, Florida State opened the new $10.5 million Morcom Aquatic Center. The state-of-the-art facility is located on the Southwest Campus next to the Don Veller Seminole Golf Course. The main pool features up to 30 practice lanes and maintains a temperature of 80 degrees. FSU swims in the same pool that hosted the 2005 FINA World Championships in Montreal, Quebec, Canada. The diving well features two one-meter and two three-meter springboards as well as one, three, five, seven-and-a-half and 10 meter platforms. The platforms are 10 feet wide making them the widest in the nation. The diving pool is kept temperature controlled at 82 degrees and also features a compression bubble used to soften a divers impact during entry while practicing platform dives. Divers will also be able to practice their dives using the dryland equipment which includes two springboards attached to an intricate rope and pulley system and a trampoline. Locker rooms and coaches offices are located in the adjoined 10,000 square-foot building, which house the athletes equipment and coaching staff.

Scott Speicher Tennis Center at the Donald Loucks Courts
The Speicher Tennis Center was named in honor of Lieutenant Commander Michael Scott Speicher, a graduate of Florida State University. Speicher was considered the first American casualty during Operation Desert Storm, but was later reclassified by the United States government as missing in action in 2001 and missing or captured a year later. However, in 2009 Speicher's remains were found in the Anbar province of Iraq after a nearly 20-year search. The Scott Speicher family was later honored by Florida State at a home football game with a missing man formation flyover from the Navy. By Presidential directive, the facility bears the name the "Scott Speicher Tennis Center". In 1947, Loucks became Florida State's first basketball coach and a year later was named the school's first tennis coach. His tennis team was the first athletic team. The varsity tennis courts were named for Loucks in 1981. He served as Dean of men from 1957 to 1967 and was known as a servant of leadership, service and devotion to many worthy causes. With the first stage of construction completed in the summer of 1993, the Scott Speicher Tennis Center at the Donald Loucks Courts opened its gates to the public for the first time at a Children's Miracle Network charity tournament. Through its 18 year existence, the Scott Speicher Tennis Center at the Donald Loucks Courts has served as the home courts for all Florida State men's and women's home dual matches, the annual Seminole Fall Classics, City of Tallahassee tennis championships, various USTA regional and zonal tournaments, the 1994 and 1995 Men's Intercollegiate tournament and the annual Children's Miracle Network Charity Invitational benefiting Shands Hospital in Gainesville. The tennis center has also been the site for the ITA Summer Circuit for men's and women's tennis in which high school and collegiate athletes participate in singles and double matches.

Indoor tennis facility
Located on the Southwest Campus, the indoor tennis facility was completed in April 2011 adjacent to the aquatics center, Seminole golf course and the engineering buildings. The multi-million dollar Indoor practice facility serves as an additional playing arena for the Florida State tennis teams. Since the completion in spring of 2011, the facility has served as both a site for training and competition. The building hosts six regulation courts, locker rooms, athletic training room, equipment room, office and lobby. For the next phase, plans are in place to add spectator seating, team lounges, extended locker rooms, offices and a press box. Besides use from the tennis programs the Multi-Purpose Educational Facility is used for academic classes, clinics and camps. The facility is the only indoor tennis facility approved for college competition in the state of Florida and only one of a few in the southeast.

Seminole Soccer Complex

In the spring of 1998, Florida State's dream of a new complex started to become a reality, as ground was broken for the new facility and construction began. Although the new facility was not completed, the Seminoles began playing on their new field in the fall of 1998. The 1999 season marked the first full season in the new 1,600 seat Seminole Soccer Complex, which is regarded as one of the nation's best with its new top-playing surface. The two-level Mary Ann Stiles & Barry Smith Team Building houses the coaches' offices which overlook the soccer field, a reception area, a combined workroom, large team and coaches locker rooms, visiting team locker rooms and training and equipment rooms. The team building will undergo a multi-million dollar renovation to the second floor beginning in October 2008 with an expected completion date in June 2009.  The expansion to the second floor will include new offices, a team meeting room, tradition space for both sports and a player lounge. Although the Seminole Soccer Complex is still one of the newest facilities on the Florida State campus, FSU's commitment to the success of the soccer program continues to show with the latest upgrade to the facility. Florida State unveiled a brand new video scoreboard in 2006. The Seminole Soccer Complex now has a capacity of 2,000.

Apalachee Regional Park
Apalachee Regional Park is the home course for the Florida State Seminoles men's and women's cross country teams.

Notable alumni

A number of FSU alumni have found success in professional sports, with 123 active alumni competing in sports including basketball, football, baseball and golf.

FSU Hall of Fame
The first hall of fame class was inducted in 1977.
For a list of inductees by sport, see footnote
For a list of inductees by year of induction, see footnote
For a list of inductees by alphabetical order, see footnote

Olympians
FSU alums have competed at the Olympic Games, winning sixteen medals: five golds, four silvers, and seven bronzes. Florida State has competed at consecutive Olympics since the 1972 Summer Olympics, sending a school-record 21 Olympians in 2016.

2006–2010 NCAA penalties
The athletic department emerged in January 2010 from NCAA sanctions resulting from the discovery of academic cheating by athletes in 2006–2007. This discovery involved athletes in ten sports programs who were taking an online course in music history. An NCAA investigation resulted in scholarship limits and negation of wins involving compromised athletes.  Florida State appealed parts of the decision. The penalties removed fourteen football wins from the career total of Seminoles football coach Bobby Bowden, yet the coach temporarily claimed the all-time record for Division 1 football wins in 2012 when a far larger number of victories was deducted from the career total of Pennsylvania State University football coach Joe Paterno. Paterno's wins were later reinstated, however, following an appeal from the Penn State Board of Trustees in January 2015., leaving Coach Bowden with the 2nd all-time winningest record in Division 1 football.

Additionally, FSU vacated 22 wins in men's basketball, an NCAA post season baseball victory, one national championship in men's track and field, an NCAA tournament victory in women's basketball, as well as other wins in these and several other men's and women's sports.

References

External links
 

 
1902 establishments in Florida